= Department of Information Technology (Botswana) =

Department of Information Technology, Botswana
- Type: Public
- Industry: Telecommunications
- Founded: 2002
- Headquarters: Gaborone, Botswana (Head office)
- Area served: Botswana
- Website: www.gov.bw/en/Ministries--Authorities/Ministries/Ministry-of-Transport-and-Communications/Departments/Information-Technology/

The Department of Information Technology formerly, known as the Government Computer Bureau, is a department in the Ministry of Transport and Communications, having previously operated under the Ministry of Communications, Science and Technology.

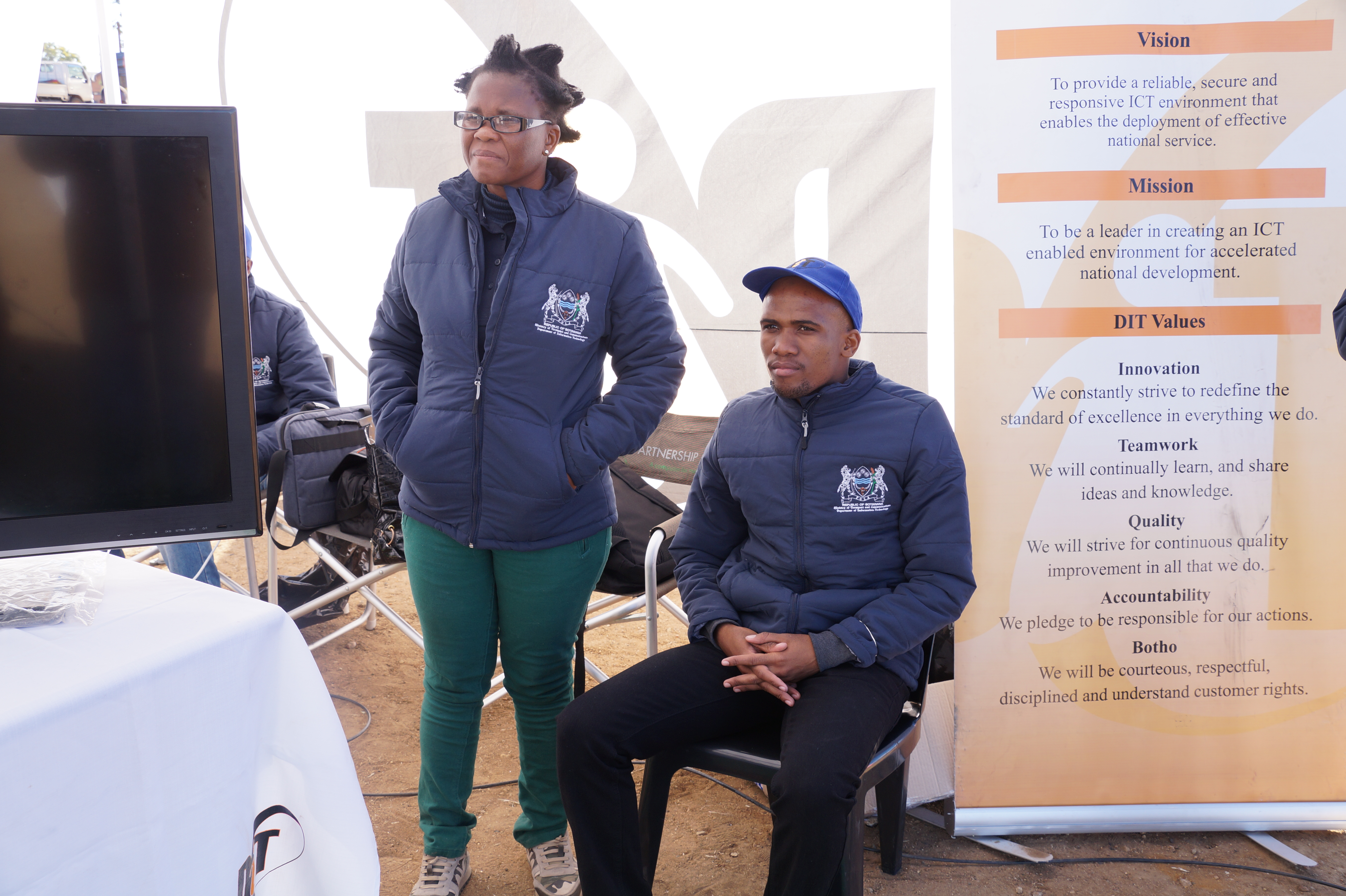

== Services Offered by the department of information technology ==
The major services that the Department of Information Technology provides to the government of Botswana include the following:

1. Government website hosting
2. Creating internet connectivity and other information technology-related services across the public sector of Botswana
